Norbert Hauata (born 8 June 1979) is a football referee from French Polynesia.

Hauata lives in Moorea where he works in construction. He became a FIFA referee in 2008. His international career includes the 2011 FIFA U-17 World Cup, the 2012 OFC Nations Cup, 2014 FIFA World Cup and the 2018 FIFA World Cup.

References

External links 
 Football line-ups profile

1979 births
Living people
French Polynesian football referees
2018 FIFA World Cup referees